Fisher's Grant 24G   is a Mi'kmaq reserve located in Pictou County, Nova Scotia.

It is administratively part of the Pictou Landing First Nation.

References
 Fisher's Grant 24G

Indian reserves in Nova Scotia
Communities in Pictou County
Mi'kmaq in Canada